Pleurobrachia is a common genus of Ctenophora(a exclusively marine phylum). Along with the genus Hormiphora, it generally has the common name sea gooseberry. It contains the following species:
Pleurobrachia arctica Wagner, 1885
Pleurobrachia australis (Benham, 1907)
Pleurobrachia bachei L. Agassiz, 1860
Pleurobrachia brunnea Mayer, 1912
Pleurobrachia dimidiata Eschscholtz, 1829
Pleurobrachia globosa Moser
Pleurobrachia pigmentata Moser, 1903
Pleurobrachia pileus (Müller, 1776)
Pleurobrachia rhododactyla L. Agassiz, 1860
Pleurobrachia rhodopis Chun, 1880
Pleurobrachia striata Moser

References

Pleurobrachiidae
Ctenophore genera